Zelym Kotsoiev (born 9 August 1998) is an Ossetian-Azerbaijani judoka. He is a three-time bronze medalist at the European Judo Championships.

In December 2014, 16-year-old Kotsoev became the winner of the first U18 World SAMBO Championship.

Career
He won the gold medal in the men's 100 kg event at the 2017 Summer Universiade held in Taipei, Taiwan.

In 2020, he won one of the bronze medals in the men's 100 kg event at the European Judo Championships held in Prague, Czech Republic.

In 2021, he won the silver medal in his event at the Judo World Masters held in Doha, Qatar. A few months later, he won the gold medal in his event at the 2021 Judo Grand Slam Antalya held in Antalya, Turkey.

He won one of the bronze medals in his event at the 2022 Judo Grand Slam Tel Aviv held in Tel Aviv, Israel.

Achievements

References

External links
 
 

Living people
1998 births
Place of birth missing (living people)
Azerbaijani male judoka
European Games competitors for Azerbaijan
Judoka at the 2019 European Games
Universiade medalists in judo
Universiade gold medalists for Azerbaijan
Medalists at the 2017 Summer Universiade
Judoka at the 2020 Summer Olympics
Olympic judoka of Azerbaijan
21st-century Azerbaijani people